Chatham station is a former railroad station located on Depot Road in Chatham, Massachusetts which houses a museum. It has been listed on the National Register of Historic Places since 1978, and it is now home to the Chatham Railroad Museum.

The Chatham Railroad Museum features many railroad artifacts, including the New York Central model locomotives used at the 1939 New York World's Fair. Other displays include original and operating Western Union telegraph equipment, lanterns, badges, signs, tools, timetables, menus and passes, promotional literature, original paintings and prints, calendars, and a restored 1910 caboose.

Service to Chatham was on a line that spurred at Harwich from the mainline to Provincetown.  Service ended to the station in the 1930s.  There is no connected railroad track running there for train service.  The former New York, New Haven and Hartford Railroad line ends in South Dennis and no longer runs to Chatham.  The nearest train service is the seasonal CapeFlyer service at the Hyannis Transportation Center in Hyannis.

Plans were made in the first years of the 21st Century to extend the Cape Cod Rail Trail into Chatham and west of Dennis and into Barnstable.

See also
National Register of Historic Places listings in Barnstable County, Massachusetts

References

External links

Chatham Railroad Museum

Chatham, Massachusetts
Railway stations on the National Register of Historic Places in Massachusetts
Old Colony Railroad Stations on Cape Cod
Stations along Old Colony Railroad lines
Queen Anne architecture in Massachusetts
Railway stations in the United States opened in 1887
Railway stations closed in 1937
Railway stations in Barnstable County, Massachusetts
National Register of Historic Places in Barnstable County, Massachusetts
Former railway stations in Massachusetts
Museums in Barnstable County, Massachusetts
Railroad museums in Massachusetts